Richard Francis Drake (September 28, 1927 – January 26, 2008) was an American politician in the state of Iowa.

Drake was born in Muscatine, Iowa. A farmer, he attended the United States Naval Academy and Iowa State University. A Republican, he also served in the Iowa State Senate from 1977 to 2005. Previously, he served in the Iowa House of Representatives from 1969 to 1977. He died in 2008 in Muscatine, Iowa.

References

1927 births
2008 deaths
Republican Party members of the Iowa House of Representatives
20th-century American politicians
Iowa State University alumni
United States Naval Academy alumni
People from Muscatine, Iowa
Farmers from Iowa
Military personnel from Iowa